Lady Xun (personal name unknown) (died 335), formally Lady of Yuzhang (豫章君), was a concubine of Emperor Yuan of Jin (Sima Rui) while he was the Prince of Langye.  Initially, he favored her greatly, and she bore him two sons – Sima Shao (Emperor Ming) and Sima Pou (司馬裒).  Because of the favor that she received, Sima Rui's wife Princess Yu Mengmu (虞孟母) was very jealous of her and mistreated her.  Lady Xun, not happy about her low station and Princess Yu's mistreatment, often complained and was rebuked by Prince Rui.  Eventually, he threw her out of the household.  After Sima Shao succeeded to the throne as Emperor Ming in 323, he gave her a mansion and created her the Lady of Jian'an.  Later that year, he welcomed her back to the palace.  After he died and his son Emperor Cheng succeeded to the throne, she was treated as virtual empress dowager without the title, and she probably effectively raised Emperor Cheng, since Emperor Cheng's mother Empress Yu Wenjun died in 328 in the midst of the Su Jun Disturbance, while Emperor Cheng was only seven.  She died in 335 and was posthumously created the Lady of Yuzhang, and a temple was built for her.  Some sources mentions that she was a Xianbei.

References

Jin dynasty (266–420) imperial consorts
335 deaths
Year of birth unknown
4th-century Chinese women